Reeve may refer to:

Titles
Reeve (Canada), an elected chief executive of some counties, townships, and equivalents
Reeve (England), an official elected annually by the serfs to supervise lands for a lord
High-reeve, a title taken by some English magistrates during the 10th and 11th centuries
Shire reeve, an official position that originated the term Sheriff
Vogt, an official in many European countries, often translated reeve

Other uses
Reeve (surname), list of notable people with the surname
Reeve, Wisconsin, an unincorporated community
Reeve knot, a stopper knot
Reeve, a female ruff (bird), a wading bird
Reeve (Final Fantasy), a character from the video game Final Fantasy VII
Reeve Electric Association Plant, listed on the National Register of Historic Places in Franklin County, Iowa
"The Reeve's Prologue and Tale", from The Canterbury Tales by Chaucer
Leander Reeve House, listed on the National Register of Historic Places in Franklin County, Iowa
To reeve a line through blocks in order to gain a mechanical advantage, a nautical term

See also
Reave, boundary wall
Reeves (disambiguation)